Juan Banderas (executed 1833 at Arizpe) was the leader of the Yaqui during part of the Yaqui Wars, specifically from 1825 until 1833.

Banderas came to the leadership of the Yaqui when they opened war against Occidente State due to opposition to threats of taxation and ending of their sovereignty. Banderas was able to convince the Mayos, Opatas and Pimas to join in the war against the Mexicans. 

In 1827 Banderas' forces suffered defeat due to using primarily bows and arrows against the Mexicans guns. Banderas then negotiated a peace in which he was pardoned and made the captain-general of the Yaqui towns.

In 1829 Occidente instituted a new plan to tax the Yaqui and also to allot their lands. They also ended the office of captain-general. Banderas decided to wait until he had better weapons to act. By 1832 he had enough guns and gunpowder to feel confident of some success in war with the Mexicans. His force of 1,000 including Opatas under the command of Dolores Gutiérrez was defeated near Buenavista in 1833. He was then captured and executed.

Sources
Spicer, Edward H. Cycles of Conquest. Tucson: University of Arizona Press, 1962.

Yaqui tribe
1833 deaths
Yaqui people
Year of birth missing